Nicholas Charles Dempsey (born 13 August 1980 in Norwich) is a British windsurfer, who lives in Poole, Dorset.  He became the first man to win three Olympics medals in windsurfing when he won silver in the 2016 Rio Olympics, adding to a silver won in the 2012 London Olympics, and a bronze from the 2004 Athens Olympics. He is also twice world champion, winning gold in 2009 and 2013.

Career
Dempsey booked his first international success at the 1998 Mistral Youth World Championships, where he won the bronze medal. As a senior his first win was clinched at the North Sea Cup Series in Pevensey Bay, and an additional third place in the Kieler Woche.

During the 2000 Summer Olympics he finished in 16th position. He continued winning competitions in 2001 and beyond like Athens Eurolymp Week, Kieler Woche and the SPA Regatta before finishing third at the 2004 Summer Olympics to take the windsurfing bronze medal.

When switching to the RS:X class he won race after race, resulting in the first spot on the RS:X world rankings. He took the gold medal at the 2006 RS:X European Championships. At the 2006 RS:X World Championships he finished in 5th position.

At the 2008 Summer Olympics he came 4th in the RS:X Class windsurfing class with 60 points. He was 2 points behind Israeli bronze medalist Shahar Zubari.

At the 2012 Summer Olympics, Dempsey won the silver medal in the RS:X Class windsurfing class, behind Dorian van Rijsselberge of the Netherlands.

In the 2016 Summer Olympics, Dempsey again won the silver in the RS:X Class, again behind van Rijsselberge. With three medals won in the Olympics, he became the most decorated men's Olympic windsurfer.

Personal life

Dempsey married yachtswoman Sarah Ayton in October 2008 just two months after she won a gold medal at the 2008 Beijing Olympics. In June 2009, they had a son, Thomas-Flynn, and another son Oscar in March 2012. The couple broke up in late 2012. Dempsey has an interest in photography.

Achievements

References

External links
 
 
 
 

1980 births
Living people
English windsurfers
English male sailors (sport)
Olympic sailors of Great Britain
British male sailors (sport)
Olympic bronze medallists for Great Britain
Sailors at the 2000 Summer Olympics – Mistral One Design
Sailors at the 2004 Summer Olympics – Mistral One Design
Sailors at the 2008 Summer Olympics – RS:X
Sailors at the 2012 Summer Olympics – RS:X
Sailors at the 2016 Summer Olympics – RS:X
Sportspeople from Norwich
Olympic medalists in sailing
Olympic silver medallists for Great Britain
Medalists at the 2004 Summer Olympics
Medalists at the 2012 Summer Olympics
Medalists at the 2016 Summer Olympics
RS:X class world champions
Sportspeople from Weymouth